Daliza Sigcawu was the regent and 8th king of the Gcaleka sub-group of the Xhosa nation after his brother Salukaphathwa Gwebi'nkumbi Sigcawu died on 30 May 1921 until he handed over the reign to his nephew Mpisekhaya Ngangomhlaba Sigcawu in 1923 when he was old enough. His father was Sigcawu ka Sarili.

Xhosa people
Rulers of the Gcaleka